The College of Food, Agricultural and Natural Resource Sciences (CFANS) is one of seventeen colleges
and professional schools at the University of Minnesota. The college offers 13 majors, 3 pre-major and pre-professional majors and 26 freestanding minors for undergraduate students and a variety of graduate study options that include master's, doctoral and joint degree programs.

History
The college was formed on July 1, 2006, with the merger of two former colleges; the College of Agricultural, Food and Environmental Sciences, and the College of Natural Resources, as well as the Department of Food Science and Nutrition. However, the origins of the college's programs extend back to 1869.

Divisions and Departments
The College of Food, Agricultural and Natural Resource Sciences comprises six divisions, twelve academic units (two are held jointly), 10 research and outreach centers throughout Minnesota, the Bell Museum of Natural History and the Minnesota Landscape Arboretum.

Majors/Minors
For the 2013-2014 academic year, the College of Food, Agricultural and Natural Resource Sciences enrolled 1,939 undergraduate students in 13 majors and 26 minors and 692 graduate students in 15 programs, including three interdisciplinary programs offered in collaboration with other colleges. The college employs 268 faculty members and hosts 10 research centers around the state that provide education, research and service to students and citizens.

Majors Include:
 Agricultural Education
 Agricultural Communication & Marketing
 Agricultural and Food Business Management
 Animal Science
 Applied Economics
 Bioproducts Marketing and Management
 Environmental Sciences, Policy and Management
 Fisheries and Wildlife
 Food Science
 Food Systems
 Forest and Natural Resource Management
 Nutrition
 Plant Science

Minors Include:
 Agronomy
 Agricultural and Food Business Management
 Animal Science
 Applied Economics
 Bio-Based Products Engineering
 Climatology
 Corporate Environmental Management
 Entomology
 Environmental Sciences, Policy and Management
 Fisheries and Wildlife
 Food Science
 Food Systems and the Environment (for non-CFANS students)
 Forest Ecosystem Management and Conservation
 Geographic Information Science
 Horticulture
 Integrated Pest Management in Cropping Systems
 International Agriculture
 Marine Biology 
 Native American Environmental Knowledge
 Nutrition
 Park and Protected Area Management
 Soil Science
 Sustainable Agriculture
 Sustainability Studies
 Urban and Community Forestry
 Water Science

Student life
The St. Paul Campus is home to one residence hall. Bailey Hall is a community of 505 residents, many of whom are CFANS students. Bailey Hall offers living and learning communities that group residence by floors  and are geared towards bringing students of similar majors together so that they can get the most out of their studies at the University of Minnesota. Communities found in Bailey Hall geared towards CFANS students include The Environment House, Pre-veterinary Science and St. Paul Leaders and Scholars.

Bailey Hall is attached to the St. Paul Campus Student Center which contains a movie theater and eight lanes of bowling, pool tables and arcade games located in the Gopher Spot. The student center also has great places to eat and hosts Gophers After Dark on the weekends.

Affiliations
The Bell Museum of Natural History.

The James Ford Bell Museum of Natural History was established by state legislative mandate in 1872. Its governance belongs, by state legislative designation, to the University of Minnesota. The Bell Museum operates independently as a unit of CFANS.

The Bell Museum of Natural History is open to the public and classrooms for tours Tuesday through Sunday.

Walk the close gardens and bike, walk or drive Three-Mile Drive to see more gardens and collections.

References

External links
College of Food, Agricultural and Natural Resource Sciences official Web site.
The Food Industry Center studies and improves how food reaches consumers.
UMN Library Collection - College of Agriculture 1917-1997

University of Minnesota
Educational institutions established in 2006
Minnesota
2006 establishments in Minnesota